Dante's Hell Animated is a 2013 American animated short film produced and directed by Boris Acosta.

The story is based on the first part of Dante Alighieri's Divine Comedy – Inferno.

Plot
This film has two versions, narrated in English and recited in Italian. The Italian version is recited in primitive Italian and Dante Alighieri's own words as he wrote the poem.

Dante gets lost in a dark wood, his way is blocked and he is threatened by three beasts: a lion, a lynx and a she-wolf. Beatrice descends from Heaven into Limbo to ask the poet Virgil to go to Dante's rescue and guide him through Inferno and Purgatorio. The film depicts a chronological descent to the nine circles of hell by Dante and Virgil through the exit into Purgatorio.

Voice cast – English version
Armand Mastroianni – Introduced by
Eric Roberts – Dante
Vincent Spano – Virgil
Nia Peeples – Beatrice
Shirly Brener – Entrance Encryption
Jeff Conaway – Circles Introduction
Helene Cardona – Francesca
Sheena Colette – Fury Megaera
Vanna Bonta – Fury Tisiphone
Bonnie Morgan – Fury Alecto
Eve Mauro – Female Demon
Rico Simonini – Centaur Chiron
Adrian Paul – Ulysses
Jose Rosete – Count Ugolino

Voice cast – Italian Version
Dino Di Durante – Introduced by
Vittorio Gassman – Dante
Silvia Colloca – Beatrice
Vittorio Matteucci – Virgil
Franco Nero – Circles Introduction
Simona Caparrini – Francesca
Veronica De Laurentiis – Fury – Tisiphone
Maude Bonanni – Fury- Megaera
Susanna Cappellaro – Fury- Alecto
Gabriel Bologna – Demons
Arnoldo Foà – Ulysses
 Marco Bonini – Guido da Montefeltro
Mario Opinato – Count Ugolino

References

External links
 
 

Films based on Inferno (Dante)
2010s Italian-language films
2013 horror films
2013 films
2010s American animated films
Demons in film
American animated short films
2013 directorial debut films
2010s English-language films